New Zealand  (abbreviated NZL) sent a team of 217 competitors and 80 officials  to the 1998 Commonwealth Games, which were held in Kuala Lumpur, Malaysia. The flagbearer at the opening ceremony was Graeme Miller, and at the closing ceremony Darren Liddel.

New Zealand has competed in every games, starting with the first British Empire Games in 1930 at Hamilton, Ontario. Selection is the responsibility of the New Zealand Olympic Committee.

Medals

 
 
New Zealand was sixth in the medal table in 1998.

Gold
Athletics:
 Beatrice Faumuina — Women's Discus Throw

Cycling:
 Glen Thomson — Men's Track Points Race
 Sarah Ulmer — Women's Track Individual Pursuit (3000m)

Rugby sevens:
 Christian Cullen, Rico Gear, Jonah Lomu, Caleb Ralph, Roger Randle, Amasio Valence, Bruce Reihana, Eric Rush, Dallas Seymour, and Joeli Vidiri — Men's Sevens Team Competition

Shooting:
 Stephen Petterson — Men's 50m Rifle Prone

Weightlifting:
 Darren Liddel — Men's + 105kg (Clean & Jerk)    
 Darren Liddel — Men's + 105kg (Snatch)    
 Darren Liddel — Men's + 105kg (Total)

Silver
Cycling:
 Susy Pryde — Women's Individual Road Race
 Sarah Ulmer — Women's Track Points Race

Netball:
 Belinda Charteris, Belinda Colling, Julie Seymour, Sonya Hardcastle, Donna Loffhagen, Bernice Mene, Lesley Nicol, Anna Rowberry, Jo Steed, Lorna Suafoa, Noeline Taurua, and Linda Vagana — Women's Team Competition

Shooting:
 Tania Corrigan and Jocelyn Lees— Women's 10m Air Pistol (Pairs) - Women    
 Tania Corrigan and Jocelyn Lees — Women's 25m Pistol (Pairs)
 Alan Earle and Jason Wakeling — Men's 25m Rapid Fire Pistol (Pairs)

Bronze
Athletics:
 Joanne Henry — Women's Heptathlon

Badminton:
 Rhona Robertson and Tammy Jenkins — Women's Doubles
 Geoff Bellingham, Chris Blair, Dean Galt, Anton Gargiulo, Nick Hall, Jarrod King, and Daniel Shirley — Men's Team

Boxing:
 Garth da Silva — Men's Heavyweight (- 91 kg)

Cricket:
 Geoff Allott, Nathan Astle, Mark Bailey, Matthew Bell, Chris Drum, Stephen Fleming, Chris Harris, Matt Horne, Dion Nash, Shayne O'Connor, Adam Parore, Craig McMillan, Alex Tait, Daniel Vettori, and Paul Wiseman — Men's Team Competition

Cycling:
 Tim Carswell — Men's Track  20km Scratch Race
 Brendon Cameron, Tim Carswell, Greg Henderson, and Lee Vertongen — Men's Track  Team Pursuit (4000m)
 Greg Henderson — Men's Track Points Race

Gymnastics:
 David Phillips — Men's Floor

Field Hockey:
 Tina Bell-Kake, Helen Clarke, Jenny Duck, Emily Gillam, Sandy Hitchcock, Anna Lawrence, Robyn Toomey, Skippy Hamahona, Suzie Pearce, Moira Senior, Jenny Shepherd, Karen Smith, Mandy Smith, Kate Trolove, Lisa Walton, and Diana Weavers — Women's Team Competition

Lawn Bowls:
 Millie Khan — Women's Singles

Shooting:
 Des Coe — Men's Trap
 Tania Corrigan — Women's 10m Air Pistol
 Sally Johnston — Women's 50m Rifle Prone
 Greg Yelavich — Men's 10m Air Pistol

Swimming:
 Toni Jeffs — Women's 50m Freestyle
 Trent Bray, Scott Cameron, John Davis, and Danyon Loader — Men's 4x200m Freestyle Relay

Squash:
 Sarah Cook and Glen Wilson — Mixed Doubles

Weightlifting:
 Nigel Avery — Men's 105kg (Snatch)
 Nigel Avery — Men's 105kg (Total)

Cricket

New Zealand Team

Athletics
Zion Armstrong
Craig Barrett
Diggory Brooke
Chantal Brunner
Alan Bunce
Hamish Christensen
Mathew Coad
Phil Costley
Chris Donaldson
Jenni Dryburgh
Shaun Farrell
Beatrice Faumuina
Melina Hamilton
Joanne Henry
Toni Hodgkinson
Philip Jensen
Cassandra Kelly
Aaron Langdon
Tania Lutton
Frith Maunder
Lee-Ann McPhillips
Rowena Morton
Denis Petouchinski
Doug Pirini
Simon Poelman
Tony Sargisson
Tasha Williams
Ian Winchester

Field Hockey

Men's Competition
Scott Anderson  
Ryan Archibald  
Michael Bevin  
Andrew Buckley  
Hymie Gill  
Dion Gosling  
Bevan Hari  
Andrew Hastie 
Brett Leaver  
Wayne McIndoe  
Umesh Parag  
Mitesh Patel  
Ken Robinson  
Darren Smith  
Andrew Timlin  
Simon Towns

Women's Competition
Tina Bell-Kake  
Helen Clarke  
Jenny Duck  
Emily Gillam  
Sandy Hitchcock  
Anna Lawrence  
Robyn Toomey  
Skippy Hamahona  
Suzie Pearce  
Moira Senior  
Jenny Shepherd  
Karen Smith  
Mandy Smith  
Kate Trolove  
Lisa Walton  
Diana Weavers

See also
New Zealand Olympic Committee 
New Zealand at the Commonwealth Games
New Zealand at the 1996 Summer Olympics
New Zealand at the 2000 Summer Olympics

External links
NZOC website on the 1998 games 
Commonwealth Games Federation website

1998
Nations at the 1998 Commonwealth Games
Commonwealth Games